The ABC Mosquito was a 120 hp (90 kW) six-cylinder radial aero engine designed by the noted British engineer Granville Bradshaw for use in light aircraft. The single Mosquito engine was built by ABC Motors, first running in 1916. It is thought that the design resulted from a bet between Harry Hawker and Bradshaw, Hawker proposing that Bradshaw could not build and fly a six-cylinder radial engine. The Mosquito used copper-plated steel Gnat cylinders. The engine was not a success.

Applications
BAT F.K. 22

Specifications (Mosquito)

See also

References

Notes

Bibliography

 Lumsden, Alec. British Piston Engines and their Aircraft. Marlborough, Wiltshire: Airlife Publishing, 2003. .

External links

1910s aircraft piston engines
Mosquito
Aircraft air-cooled radial piston engines